Flax und Krümel was an East German television series for children, broadcast between 1955 and 1970.

The series was created by puppeteers Heinz and Ingeburg Fülfe, and featured the adventures of Flax, a young boy; Krümel, a young girl; her grandmother ("Oma"); and the dog Struppi.

See also
List of German television series

References

External links
 

1950s German television series
1960s German television series
1955 German television series debuts
1970 German television series endings
German children's television series
German-language television shows
Television in East Germany